Gabukhali is a village located in Dhakuria Union in the Manirampur Upazila of the Jessore District in the country of Bangladesh.

References 

Jashore District